A Saucerful of Secrets is the second studio album by the English rock band Pink Floyd, released on 28 June 1968 by EMI Columbia in the UK and on 27 July 1968 in the US by Tower Records. During recording, the mental health of singer and guitarist Syd Barrett deteriorated, so David Gilmour was recruited; Barrett left the band before the album's completion.

Whereas Barrett had been the primary songwriter on Pink Floyd's debut album, The Piper at the Gates of Dawn (1967), on A Saucerful of Secrets each member contributed songwriting and lead vocals. Gilmour appeared on all but two songs, while Barrett contributed to three. "Set the Controls for the Heart of the Sun" is the only song on which all five members appear.

A Saucerful of Secrets reached number nine in the UK charts, but did not chart in the US until April 2019, peaking at number 158. It received mostly positive reviews, though many critics have deemed it inferior to The Piper at the Gates of Dawn.

Recording

Pink Floyd released their debut album, The Piper at the Gates of Dawn, in August 1967. Work began on A Saucerful of Secrets in the same month, at EMI Studios (now Abbey Road Studios) in London, with producer Norman Smith. The first songs recorded were "Set the Controls for the Heart of the Sun" and "Scream Thy Last Scream", both recorded on 7–8 August 1967. The tracks were planned for release as a single on 8 September, but this was vetoed by Pink Floyd's record company, EMI.

The band recorded "Vegetable Man" at De Lane Lea Studios in Soho on 9–11 October, and returned on 19 October to record "Jugband Blues", with  Smith booking a Salvation Army band. During these sessions, bandleader Syd Barrett overdubbed slide guitar onto "Remember a Day", an outtake from The Piper at the Gates of Dawn. The band took a break to record "Apples and Oranges" on 26 and 27 October. A few days later, they recorded what would become the B-side, "Paint Box", before leaving for a US tour. In November, "Apples and Oranges" was released as a single but failed to chart.

Around this time, the mental health of guitarist Syd Barrett was deteriorating; he was often unresponsive and would not play, leading to the cancellation of several performances and Pink Floyd's first US tour. In December 1967, reaching a crisis point with Barrett, Pink Floyd added guitarist David Gilmour as the fifth member. According to Jenner, the group planned that Gilmour would "cover for [Barrett's] eccentricities". When this proved unworkable, "Syd was just going to write. Just to try to keep him involved."

For two days from 10 January 1968, Pink Floyd reconvened at EMI Studios, attempting to work on older tracks: Waters' vocals and keyboardist Richard Wright's organ were overdubbed onto "Set the Controls for the Heart of the Sun", while drummer Nick Mason added vocals to "Scream Thy Last Scream".

From 12 January till the 20th, Pink Floyd performed briefly as a five-piece. Gilmour played and sang while Barrett wandered around on stage, occasionally joining in with the playing. Between these gigs, the group rehearsed new songs written by Waters on 15 and 16 January. During the next session, on 18 January, the band jammed on rhythm tracks, joined by Smith; Barrett did not attend. On 24 and 25 January, they recorded a song logged as "The Most Boring Song I've Ever Heard Bar 2" at EMI.  The band recorded "Let There Be More Light", "Corporal Clegg" (which features lead vocals by Mason), and "See-Saw" all without Barrett, though manager Andrew King said Barrett performed the slide solo at the end of "Let There Be More Light".

On 26 January 1968, when the band was driving to a show at Southampton University, they decided not to pick up Barrett. Barrett was finally ousted in late January 1968, leaving the band to finish the album without him. "Set the Controls for the Heart of the Sun" is the only song on which all five band members appeared. The band struggled to come up with new material, but in February 1968 recorded Wright's "It Would Be So Nice" and Waters' "Julia Dream". In early February, it was announced Waters’ track "Corporal Clegg" would be the next single; however, due to pressure from the label, the song was earmarked for the album, and "It Would Be So Nice" was released in April, with "Julia Dream" on the B-side.

Throughout April, the band took stock of their work. Waters blocked "Vegetable Man" and "Scream Thy Last Scream" from the album, but they retained "Jugband Blues" and "Set the Controls for the Heart of the Sun". Without enough material to fill an album, the band started putting together music that became the title track. Mason and Waters planned it out as if it were an architectural design, including peaks and troughs. Smith did not approve, telling them they had to stick to three-minute songs. On 25 June, the band recorded another session for the BBC radio show Top Gear, including two tracks from the album: the session featured two tracks from Saucerful: "Let There Be More Light" and an abridged version of the title track, "The Massed Gadgets of Hercules".

Songs
Unlike The Piper at the Gates of Dawn, which was dominated by Barrett's compositions, A Saucerful of Secrets contains only one Barrett original: "Jugband Blues". AllMusic described that with A Saucerful of Secrets, "the band begin to map out the dark and repetitive pulses that would characterize their next few records." Wright sings or shares lead vocals on four of the album's seven songs, and contributes vocals on the eleven-and-a-half-minute instrumental opus "A Saucerful of Secrets", making this the only Pink Floyd album where his vocal contributions outnumber those of the rest of the band.

With Barrett seemingly detached from proceedings, it came down to Waters and Wright to provide adequate material. The opening, "Let There Be More Light", written by Waters, continues the space rock approach established by Barrett. "Let There Be More Light" evolved from a bass riff that was part of "Interstellar Overdrive". Both "Remember a Day" and "See-Saw" use the childlike approach that was established on their debut. Wright remained critical of his early contributions to the band.

"Set the Controls for the Heart of the Sun" was first performed with Barrett in 1967. The success of the track was such that it remained in their live setlist until 1973 where it appeared in a greatly extended form. Waters later performed the track during solo concerts from 1984 and later. Waters borrowed the lyrics from a book of Chinese poetry from the Tang Dynasty, like Barrett had used in "Chapter 24".

"Corporal Clegg" is the first Pink Floyd song to address issues of war, a theme which would endure throughout the career of Waters as a songwriter for the band, culminating on the 1983 album The Final Cut. The title track was originally written as a new version of "Nick's Boogie". The track is titled as four parts on Ummagumma. A staple in the band's live set until summer 1972, a live version of the song was recorded on 27 April 1969 at the Mothers Club in Birmingham for inclusion on Ummagumma.

"Jugband Blues" is often thought to refer to Barrett's departure from the group ("It's awfully considerate of you to think of me here / And I'm most obliged to you for making it clear that I'm not here"). A promotional video was recorded for the track. The band's management wanted to release the song as a single, but it was vetoed by the band and Smith.

Unreleased songs

As well as "Jugband Blues", the album was to include "Vegetable Man", another Barrett composition. The song was to appear on a single as the B-side to Barrett's "Scream Thy Last Scream". The band performed "Jugband Blues", "Vegetable Man" and "Scream Thy Last Scream" for a Top Gear session, recorded on 20 December 1967, and broadcast on the 31st. Two additional Barrett songs, "In the Beechwoods", and "No Title" (frequently referred to on bootlegs as "Sunshine"), were recorded early in the album sessions. After years of only being available via bootlegs, "Vegetable Man", "Scream Thy Last Scream", and "In the Beechwoods" were officially released on The Early Years 1965–1972 compilation. At least one other song, "John Latham", was recorded during these sessions and has been released.

Album cover
A Saucerful of Secrets was the first of several Pink Floyd album covers created by the design group Hipgnosis. After the Beatles, it was the second time that EMI had permitted one of their acts to hire outside designers for an album jacket. The cover, designed by Storm Thorgerson, contains an image of Doctor Strange from issue #158 of the comic book Strange Tales, illustrated by Marie Severin.

Release and reception

The album was released in the UK on Monday, 1 July 1968 on EMI's Columbia label, reaching number 9 in the UK charts. It was released in the US by the Tower Records division of Capitol, where it was the only Pink Floyd album not to chart until 2019, when it peaked at 158. However, when reissued as A Nice Pair with the original version of The Piper at the Gates of Dawn after the success of The Dark Side of the Moon, the album did chart at number 36 on the Billboard 200. "Let There Be More Light" was released as a single, backed with "Remember a Day", in the US on 19 August 1968. Rolling Stone was unfavourable, writing that the album was "not as interesting as their first" and "rather mediocre", highlighting the reduced contributions from Barrett.

The stereo mix of the album was first released on CD in 1988, and in 1992 was digitally remastered and reissued as part of the Shine On box set. The remastered stereo CD was released on its own in 1994 in the UK and the US. The mono version of the album has never been officially released on CD. The stereo mix was remastered and re-issued in 2011 by Capitol/EMI as part of the Why Pink Floyd: Discovery series, and again in 2016 by Sony Music under the Pink Floyd Records label. The mono mix was reissued on vinyl for Record Store Day in April, 2019 by Sony Music and Warner Music Group under the Pink Floyd Records label. The album finally charted on the Billboard 200 as a standalone peaking at No. 158 when the mono mix was re-released for Record Store Day.

In a retrospective review for AllMusic, Richie Unterberger draws attention to the album's "gentle, fairy-tale ambience", with songs that move from "concise and vivid" to "spacy, ethereal material with lengthy instrumental passages". In a review for BBC Music, Daryl Easlea said Saucerful was "not without filler", adding that "Jugband Blues" was "the most chilling" song on the album.

In 2014, Mason named A Saucerful of Secrets his favourite Pink Floyd album: "I think there are ideas contained there that we have continued to use all the way through our career. I think [it] was a quite good way of marking Syd's departure and Dave's arrival. It's rather nice to have it on one record, where you get both things. It's a cross-fade rather than a cut."

Track listing

Personnel
Track numbers noted in parenthesis below are based on CD track numbering.

Pink Floyd
Roger Waters – bass guitar , percussion , vocals
Richard Wright – Farfisa organ , piano , Hammond organ , Mellotron , vibraphone , celesta , xylophone , tin whistle , vocals
David Gilmour – guitars , kazoo , vocals
Nick Mason – drums , percussion , lead vocals , kazoo 
Syd Barrett – vocals , slide guitar , acoustic guitar , electric guitar 
Additional personnel
Norman Smith – producer, drums , backing vocals , voice 
 The Stanley Myers Orchestra 
The Salvation Army (The International Staff Band) – brass section

Charts and certifications

Charts

Certifications

References
Footnotes

Citations

Bibliography

External links

1968 albums
Albums produced by Norman Smith (record producer)
Albums with cover art by Hipgnosis
Albums with cover art by Storm Thorgerson
Pink Floyd albums
Tower Records albums
EMI Columbia Records albums